North Sioux City is a city in Union County, South Dakota, United States. The population was 3,042 at the 2020 census. It is part of the Sioux City, IA-NE-SD Metropolitan Statistical Area.

History
The southern tip of this land between the Missouri River from the west and south and the Big Sioux River from the north and east was a meeting place for Native American Indians traveling the two rivers. Area tribes current to the 1804 Lewis and Clark expedition were the Omaha, Yankton Dakota and Ponca, all Siouan language speakers.

French-Canadian farmer Joseph La Plant, born ca. 1823 in Indiana, settled at Sioux Point in 1849 and is listed with other early settlers in the 1860 census as living "Between Big Sioux and Big Stone Lake" in the "Unorganized" area of Minnesota, with the closest post office located immediately down and across the rivers in Sioux City, Iowa.

North Sioux City was incorporated in 1951.

Geography
North Sioux City is located at  (42.530999, -96.495494), bounded on the east by the Big Sioux River and on the west by the oxbow McCook Lake.

North Sioux City has been assigned the ZIP code 57049 and the FIPS place code 45700.

Demographics

2010 census
At the 2010 census there were 2,530 people, 1,073 households, and 679 families living in the city. The racial makeup of the city was 93.5% White, 0.6% African American, 1.3% Native American, 0.6% Asian, 0.1% Pacific Islander, 1.4% from other races, and 2.6% from two or more races. Hispanic or Latino of any race were 3.8%.

Of the 1,073 households 31.5% had children under the age of 18 living with them, 46.3% were married couples living together, 12.0% had a female householder with no husband present, 4.9% had a male householder with no wife present, and 36.7% were non-families. 30.3% of households were one person and 10.2% were one person aged 65 or older. The average household size was 2.36 and the average family size was 2.93.

The median age was 37.4 years. 24.7% of residents were under the age of 18; 7.7% were between the ages of 18 and 24; 27% were from 25 to 44; 27.4% were from 45 to 64; and 13.1% were 65 or older. The gender makeup of the city was 49.0% male and 51.0% female.

2000 census
At the 2000 census, there were 2,288 people, 916 households, and  621 families living in the city. The racial makeup of the city was 95.32% White, 0.61% African American, 0.79% Native American, 1.05% Asian, 0.04% Pacific Islander, 0.57% from other races, and 1.62% from two or more races. Hispanic or Latino of any race were 2.49% of the population.

Of the 916 households 37.2% had children under the age of 18 living with them, 51.3% were married couples living together, 11.8% had a female householder with no husband present, and 32.1% were non-families. 25.0% of households were one person and 7.9% were one person aged 65 or older. The average household size was 2.50 and the average family size was 2.99.

The age distribution was 27.1% under the age of 18, 9.3% from 18 to 24, 32.3% from 25 to 44, 20.7% from 45 to 64, and 10.6% 65 or older. The median age was 34 years. For every 100 females, there were 106.9 males. For every 100 females age 18 and over, there were 104.2 males.

The median household income was $39,333, and the median family income  was $44,926. Males had a median income of $31,800 versus $22,480 for females. The per capita income for the city was $21,416. About 5.0% of families and 5.7% of the population were below the poverty line, including 9.3% of those under age 18 and 3.7% of those age 65 or over.

Major businesses

Military Road is locally known as "The Strip" hosts a number of casinos and fireworks stores. These take advantage of the lack of these products in neighboring Nebraska. Legalization of recreational marijuana in South Dakota is expected to encourage the opening of similar shops selling to out-of-state customers.

North Sioux City is the former home of Gateway, Inc., the area's most well-known employer. At its height, Gateway employed over 6000 employees. After Acer Computers bought out the majority of Gateway (MPC of Idaho purchased the business portion) in late 2007, several layoffs have taken place. Fewer than 100 people have jobs at the original facility. Acer has expressed interest in selling the facility.

Other companies are renting from the facility, including Alorica, which absorbed a number of Gateway phone jobs. They are handling the AT&T account.

On August 18, 2008, MPC announced the lay-offs of 55 people currently employed (who were all former Gateway employees).  On October 17, 2008 MPC laid-off 98 more employees at the former Gateway facility, many of whom were former Gateway employees.

Mars Petcare purchased the city's Menu Foods plant in October 2007 and operated it until 2011, when the plant was turned over to Mars' Royal Canin division. In 2016 Royal Canin broke ground on a 45,000 sq ft addition to the plant and invested about $60 million in state-of-the-art facilities to enhance its production of specialty pet foods.

In response to steadily increasing demand for their pet food products, Royal Canin announced in February 2022 that they would invest another $185 million in new production lines at their North Sioux City plant, which is expected to create 149 new jobs. As of February 2022, Royal Canin was operating 12 production plants in Europe, Russia, Africa, East Asia, South America and North America.

Education
North Sioux City Public Schools are part of the Dakota Valley School District (South Dakota). The Dakota Valley School District has one elementary school, one middle school, and one high school.

Students attend Dakota Valley High School.

References

External links

 City of North Sioux City, South Dakota

Cities in South Dakota
Cities in Union County, South Dakota
Sioux City metropolitan area